Linda Kathleen Murphy (born September 3, 1943) is an American former volleyball player. She played for the United States national team at the 1963 Pan American Games, the 1964 Summer Olympics, and the 1967 Pan American Games. She was born in Glendale, California.

References

External links

1943 births
Living people
Olympic volleyball players of the United States
Volleyball players at the 1964 Summer Olympics
Volleyball players at the 1963 Pan American Games
Volleyball players at the 1967 Pan American Games
Pan American Games gold medalists for the United States
Pan American Games silver medalists for the United States
Sportspeople from Glendale, California
American women's volleyball players
Pan American Games medalists in volleyball
Medalists at the 1963 Pan American Games
Medalists at the 1967 Pan American Games
21st-century American women